The Rumour File is a morning radio segment on 3AW in Melbourne, Australia which began in 1993. Listeners are encouraged to call in with rumours they have heard.  The segment also runs promotions and games.

Rumour File is reported to be one of Melbourne's most popular radio segments. The segment airs weekdays at 7:07am.

The segment has a daily winner and a weekly winner. These winners - as well as wildcard entries - go into the draw for the annual prize, which is chosen at random. The winner receives a brand new Lexus. On January 16, 2018, it was announced that the BMW Australian network would be supplying the winning prize.

On December 17, 2018 it was announced that Mercedes Berwick would sponsor the 2019 prize.

Winners
 2005 - Greg
 2006 - KuzzNshazziie
 2007 - Worldwide-Store (First eBay company to win)
 2008 - David 
 2009 - ?
 2010 - Mile High
 2011 - ?
 2012 - Robert
 2013 - Punch up (Ali)
 2014 - Christmas in July
 2015 - No World Record
 2016 - Home Run
 2017 - Black Market Pads
 2018 - Only The Brave
 2019 - Watch This Space
 2020 - Don't Kiss the Bride
 2021 - Fly High
 2022 - Internal Fixation

References

External links 
 Rumour File

External links
 3AW

Australian radio programs